E3 ubiquitin-protein ligase BRE1A is an enzyme that in humans is encoded by the RNF20 gene.

The protein encoded by this gene shares similarity with BRE1 of S. cerevisiae. Yeast BRE1 is a ubiquitin ligase required for the ubiquitination of histone H2B and the methylation of histone H3.

See also
 RING finger domain

References

Further reading

External links 
 

RING finger proteins